Rob Brooks Phillips (born 1960) is an American biophysicist. He is currently Fred and Nancy Morris Professor of Biophysics, Biology, and Physics at the California Institute of Technology.

Biography 
Phillips originally did not intend to go to college and took an unconventional educational path, earning a bachelor's degree by independent study at the University of Minnesota in 1986. He then received his doctorate in physics at Washington University in St. Louis in 1989. He was a professor at Brown University  and has been a professor at Caltech since 2000. He enjoys surfing.

Awards 

 Fellow, American Physical Society (2009)
 Fellow, American Academy of Arts and Sciences
 National Institutes of Health Director's Pioneer Award (2004)
 National Science Foundation CAREER Award
 Caltech ASCIT teaching award (2017)
 2020–21 Richard P. Feynman Prize for Excellence in Teaching, Caltech's highest teaching prize

Works 

 Physical Biology of the Cell (textbook)

Images

References 

Living people
Washington University physicists
California Institute of Technology faculty
Washington University in St. Louis alumni
University of Minnesota alumni
American physicists
American biophysicists
Brown University faculty
Fellows of the American Academy of Arts and Sciences
Fellows of the American Physical Society
1960 births